The Sites Homestead, also known as the Wayside Inn or the Sites Inn, is located near Seneca Rocks, West Virginia. The log house was built by Jacob Sites circa 1839 below the Seneca Rocks ridge. The house was expanded in the mid-1870s with a frame addition, remaining in the Sites family until it was acquired by the U.S. Forest Service in 1968 as part of Spruce Knob–Seneca Rocks National Recreation Area in Monongahela National Forest. The house had been used as a storage shed for some time and was in poor condition.  It was restored by the Forest Service in the 1980s and became a temporary visitor center in 1992 after the Seneca Rocks visitor center burned. It is now part of the Seneca Rocks Discovery Center facility, operated by the Forest Service.

References

External links

Sites Homestead at Monongahela National Forest

1839 establishments in West Virginia
Gardens in West Virginia
Historic American Buildings Survey in West Virginia
Houses completed in 1839
Houses in Pendleton County, West Virginia
Houses on the National Register of Historic Places in West Virginia
I-house architecture in West Virginia
Log buildings and structures on the National Register of Historic Places in West Virginia
Museums in Pendleton County, West Virginia
National Register of Historic Places in Pendleton County, West Virginia
Vernacular architecture in West Virginia